Shurab (also Romanized as Shūrāb and Shūr Āb) is a village in Bagh-e Keshmir Rural District, Salehabad County, Razavi Khorasan Province, Iran. At the 2006 census, its population was 70, in 15 families.

References 

Populated places in   Torbat-e Jam County